Scotocyma is a genus of moths in the family Geometridae described by Turner in 1904. All the species in this genus are found in Australia.

Species
Scotocyma albinotata (Walker, [1866])
Scotocyma euryochra Turner, 1922
Scotocyma idioschema Turner, 1922
Scotocyma ischnophrica Turner, 1932
Scotocyma pteridophila (Turner, 1907)
Scotocyma rutilimixta Schmidt, 2005
Scotocyma transfixa Turner, 1931

References

Geometridae